Mars 6, also known as 3MP No.50P was a Soviet spacecraft launched to explore Mars. A 3MP bus spacecraft launched as part of the Mars program, it consisted of a lander, and a coast stage with instruments to study Mars as it flew past.

Spacecraft 
The Mars 6 spacecraft carried an array of instruments to study Mars. The lander was equipped with a thermometer and barometer to determine the surface conditions, an accelerometer and radio altimeter for descent, and instruments to analyse the surface material including a mass spectrometer. The coast stage, or bus, carried a magnetometer, plasma traps, cosmic ray and micrometeoroid detectors, and an instrument to study proton and electron fluxes from the Sun.

Built by Lavochkin, Mars 6 was the first of two 3MP spacecraft launched to Mars in 1973 and was followed by Mars 7. Two orbiters, Mars 4 and Mars 5, were launched earlier in the 1973 Mars launch window and were expected to relay data for the two landers. However, Mars 4 failed to enter orbit, and Mars 5 failed after a few days in orbit.

Launch 
Mars 6 was launched by a Proton-K carrier rocket with a Blok D upper stage, flying from Baikonur Cosmodrome Site 81/23. The launch occurred at 17:45:48 UTC on 5 August 1973, with the first three stages placing the spacecraft and upper stage into a low Earth parking orbit before the Blok D fired to propel Mars 6 into heliocentric orbit bound for Mars. The spacecraft performed a course correction on 13 August 1973.

A parachute was then deployed to further slow the probe's descent, and retrorockets were intended to fire during the last seconds before the probe reached the ground.

The spacecraft returned data for 224 seconds during its descent through the Martian atmosphere. However, at 09:11:05 UTC, with the spacecraft about to fire its retrorockets in preparation for landing, all contact was lost. Due to a design flaw, a chip aboard the spacecraft had degraded during the mission, and a large amount of the data which had been returned was unusable.

See also

 List of artificial objects on Mars
 List of missions to Mars
 Timeline of artificial satellites and space probes

References 

Spacecraft launched in 1973
1973 in spaceflight
1973 in the Soviet Union
Mars program
Derelict satellites in heliocentric orbit
4MV
1974 on Mars